Macaulay Culkin is an American actor and musician. The following are his roles in film, television and web series.

Film

Television

Web

References

American filmographies
Male actor filmographies